Grynfeltt–Lesshaft hernia is a herniation of abdominal contents through the back, specifically through the superior lumbar triangle, which is defined by the quadratus lumborum muscle, twelfth rib, and internal oblique muscle.

History
Grynfeltt described a hernia through the superior lumbar triangle in 1866 (Grynfeltt, 1866). In 1870, Lesshaft independently reported a similar case (Lesshaft, 1870).

See also
 Petit's hernia

References
 Grynfeltt, J.: La Hernie Lombaire. Montpellier Med., 16:329, 1866.
 Lesshaft, P.: Die Lumbalgegend in Anat. Chirurgischer Hinsicht. Arch. f. Anat. u. Physiol. u. Wissensch., Med. Leipzig, 37:264, 1870.

Hernias